Minard may refer to:

Places:

Minard, Argyll, Scotland, United Kingdom
Minard Castle a castle in Argyll
Minard Castle (County Kerry) a castle in County Kerry, Ireland

People with the surname:

Charles Joseph Minard (1781–1870), French civil engineer and noted pioneer in infographics
Chris Minard (born 1981), Canadian ice hockey player
David Minard (1913–2005), American physiologist
Joseph M. Minard (1932–2022), American politician from West Virginia
Lawrence Minard (1949–2001), American journalist

See also
Menard (disambiguation)